Ice XVI is the least dense (0.81 g/cm) experimentally obtained crystalline form of ice. It is topologically equivalent to the empty structure of sII clathrate hydrates. It was first obtained in 2014 by removing gas molecules from a neon clathrate under vacuum at temperatures below 147 K. The resulting empty water frame, ice XVI, is thermodynamically unstable at the experimental conditions, yet it can be preserved at cryogenic temperatures. Above 145–147 K at positive pressures ice XVI transforms into the stacking-faulty ice Ic and further into ordinary ice Ih. Theoretical studies predict ice XVI to be thermodynamically stable at negative pressures (that is under tension).

References

Water ice